This is a list of lakes of Greece.

Natural lakes of Greece

 Central Greece
Lake Amvrakia
Lake Dystos, Euboea, presently largely drained
Lake Lysimachia
Lake Ozeros
Lake Saltini
Lake Voulkaria
Lake Yliki
Lake Trichonida
Lake Vouliagmeni, Attica
 Crete
 Lake Kournas
 Lake Voulismeni
 Epirus
Lake Gistova
Lake Ioannina (Pamvotis)
Lake Morfi
 Macedonia
Lake Chimaditida
Lake Doirani, eastern portion
Lake Kastoria (Orestiada)
Lake Koronia
Lake Prespa, southeastern portion
Lake Mikri Prespa
Lake Vegoritida
Lake Volvi
 Lake Zazari
 Thrace
Lake Mitrikou
Lake Vistonida
 Peloponnese
Lake Kaiafas
Lake Lamia, Achaia
Lake Stymfalia
Lake Vouliagmeni, Corinthia
Lake Taka

Former natural lakes

Lake Copais, Boeotia
Lake Karla (Voivis), near Volos

Artificial lakes

 Central Greece
Evinos Lake
Kastraki Lake
Kremasta or Acheloos Lake
Marathon Lake
Mornos Lake
Stratos Lake
 Macedonia
Kerkini Lake
Polyfytos Lake
 Agra Lake, Pella
 Peloponnese
Doxa Lake
Ladon Lake
Pineios Lake
 Tsivlou Lake
 Thessaly
Plastiras Lake
Crete  
 Zaros Lake

Future artificial lakes
Lake Karla (restored)

See also

External links

Greece
Lakes